Triunfo is a municipality in the state of Rio Grande do Sul, Brazil. The population is 29,856 (2020 est.) in an area of 818.80 km². It is situated at the confluence of the rivers Taquari and Jacuí. It is the richest municipality in Brazil, with a per capita income of R$122,750 (US$65,275).

See also
List of municipalities in Rio Grande do Sul

References

Municipalities in Rio Grande do Sul